US Post Office-Arlington is a historic post office building located in the Clarendon neighborhood of Arlington, Virginia.  It was designed and built in 1937, and is one of a number of post offices designed by the Office of the Supervising Architect of the Treasury Department under Louis A. Simon.  The building is a one-story, pentagonal shaped brick building in the Georgian Revival style. Atop the entrance portico is a dome that rises above the buildings flat roof and is supported by four fluted limestone piers.  The interior features murals by Auriel Bessemer picturing Native Americans on Analostan Island, Captain John Smith and the Native Americans, tobacco picking by the Lee mansion, Robert E. Lee receiving his Confederate commission in Richmond, a picnic at Great Falls, polo players at Fort Myer, and a contemporary harvest at an apple orchard.

It was listed on the National Register of Historic Places on February 7, 1986.

References

External links
Arlington Post Office, 3118 N. Washington Boulevard, Arlington, Arlington County, VA: 3 data pages at Historic American Buildings Survey
 

Arlington
Colonial Revival architecture in Virginia
Government buildings completed in 1937
National Register of Historic Places in Arlington County, Virginia